Antje von Seydlitz-Kurzbach (born September 16, 1990) is a German-Canadian rower. She competed at several World cups and international events, along with the 2015 Pan American Games. von Seydlitz is a former world championships silver medalist in the women's quadruple sculls event.

In June 2016, she was officially named to Canada's 2016 Olympic team.

References

1990 births
Living people
Rowers at the 2015 Pan American Games
World Rowing Championships medalists for Canada
Canadian female rowers
Pan American Games gold medalists for Canada
Rowers at the 2016 Summer Olympics
Olympic rowers of Canada
Pan American Games medalists in rowing
Medalists at the 2015 Pan American Games